The 2016 Liqui Moly Bathurst 12 Hour was an endurance race for a variety of GT and touring car classes, including: GT3 cars, GT4 cars and Group 3E Series Production Cars. The event, which was staged at the Mount Panorama Circuit, near Bathurst, in New South Wales, Australia on 7 February 2016, was the fourteenth running of the Bathurst 12 Hour. It was also the opening round of the 2016 Intercontinental GT Challenge Series.

37 cars were entered for the race and 36 cars started the race, with one entry withdrawn following a crash in practice. Álvaro Parente, Shane van Gisbergen and Jonathon Webb won the event driving a McLaren 650S GT3. Despite 13 safety car periods, the race ended with 297 laps completed, a race record distance.

Class structure
Cars competed in the following three classes.
 Class A – GT3 Outright
 Class AP – GT3 Pro-Am, for driver combinations including one unseeded driver.
 Class AA – GT3 Am, for driver combinations including two or three unseeded drivers.
 Class B – GT3 Cup Cars
 Class I – Invitational

Class C was also available for entry for GT4 cars, however due to lack of entries, the sole Class C car entered was merged into Class I.

Official results

 – The #93 MARC Cars Australia entry was listed in both the official entry list and the official results as a MARC Focus GTC but it was actually a MARC Mazda3 GTC.
 – Will Bamber was unable to drive in the race following a crash during the qualifying session.
 – Greame Dowsett was unable to drive in the race following a pre-race injury. He was replaced by Nick Foster
 Class winners are shown in bold.
 Race time of winning car: 12:01:05.1330
 Fastest race lap: 2:01.5670 – Shane van Gisbergen

References

External links
 

Motorsport in Bathurst, New South Wales
Liqui Moly Bathurst 12 Hour
Liqui Moly Bathurst 12 Hour
Liqui